Set My Love In Motion is the fifth studio album by American singer and songwriter Syreeta Wright, released on October 21, 1981 by Motown.

The album yielded three singles: "You Set My Love in Motion", "Can't Shake Your Love" and "Quick Slick". Set My Love in Motion did not score any commercial success, reaching the lower half of the Billboard 200 album chart, where it peaked at No. 189, but fared much better on the Black Albums chart, where it reached the top forty on that chart.

Track listing
Side one
"Quick Slick" (Norma Helms, Hal Davis, Mitchell Bottler) – 5:24
"Move It, Do It" (Angelo Bond, Todd Cochrane, William Weatherspoon) – 3:54
"You Set My Love in Motion" (Maureen Bailey, David Richard Cohen) – 3:29
"There's Nothing Like a Woman in Love" (Brian Short, Gloria Sklerov) – 4:22
"Can't Shake Your Love" (Norma Helms, Hal Davis, Mitchell Bottler) – 4:12
Side two
"I Must Be in Love" (Kenneth Hirsch, Mark Mueller) – 3:52
"Wish Upon a Star" (Syreeta Wright) – 3:45
"Out the Box" (Ollie E. Brown, Paul M. Jackson, Jr., Syreeta Wright) – 5:44
"I Know The Way To Your Heart" (Joe Blocker, Marlo Henderson) – 4:07
"I Love You" (Paul Hines, James S. Stewart, Jr., Syreeta Wright) – 4:21

Personnel
Syreeta – vocals
Barry Finnerty, Carlos Rios, David T. Walker, Robert Palmer – guitar
Paul Jackson Jr. – synthesizer, guitar
Todd Cochran – keyboards, synthesizer
Nathan Watts, Romeo Williams – bass guitar
Clarence McDonald, John Barnes, Sylvester Rivers – keyboards
Michael Boddicker – synthesizer
Marlo Henderson – guitar, sitar
Wayne Stalling, William Bryant Jr. – clavinet, piano, synthesizer
Eddie "Klunis" Summers, James Gadson, Kenneth Elliott, Ollie E. Brown – drums
Melvin "Melmel" Webb, Ollie E. Brown, Paulinho da Costa – percussion
Gary Herbig, Gerald Albright – saxophone
Andrea Robinson, Jeanette Hawes, Jim Gilstrap, Lynn Davis, Marti McCall, Patti Brooks, Suzanne Coston – backing vocals
Jerry Hey – horn arrangements
Gene Page – string arrangements

Chart performance

References

External links

1981 albums
Syreeta albums
Boogie albums
Albums arranged by Gene Page
Albums produced by Hal Davis
Tamla Records albums